The chestnut-bellied mountain tanager (Dubusia castaneoventris) is a species of bird in the family Thraupidae.

It is found in Bolivia and Peru. Its natural habitat is subtropical or tropical moist montane forests.

References

chestnut-bellied mountain tanager
Birds of the Bolivian Andes
Birds of the Peruvian Andes
chestnut-bellied mountain tanager
chestnut-bellied mountain tanager